Max Patterson Memorial City Park is a public park in Gladstone, Oregon, United States.

History
In June 2020, more than 150 people attended a rally at the park in support of the Black Lives Matter movement.

References

External links

 Max Patterson Memorial City Park at the City of Gladstone, Oregon

Gladstone, Oregon
Parks in Clackamas County, Oregon